Sol Nascente (English: Rising Sun) is a Brazilian telenovela produced and broadcast by TV Globo. It premiered on 29 August 2016, replacing Êta Mundo Bom!.

Created by Walther Negrão, Suzana Pires and Júlio Fischer, in collaboration with Jackie Vellego and Fausto Galvão. The telenovela is directed by Marcelo Travesso and Leonardo Nogueira.

Features performances by Giovanna Antonelli, Bruno Gagliasso, Rafael Cardoso, Francisco Cuoco and Aracy Balabanian, Marcello Novaes, Henri Castelli, Jean Pierre Noher, Claudia Ohana, Marcelo Faria, Luís Melo, Marcello Melo Jr. and Leticia Spiller in the main roles.

Plot 
Set in the fictional Village of the Sol Nascente, the plot follows the journey of two friends from different backgrounds: the grandson of Italian immigrants Gaetano and Geppina, who came to and Brazil to escape the mafia, Mario is a longtime friend of Alice, raised by the Japanese Kazuo Tanaka as the adopted daughter, along with cousins; Yumi, Hiromi and Hideo. The friendship is shattered when Mario comes out in love with his childhood friend, Alice who plans to study in Japan for two years. Immature and impulsive, he will have to change his ways to conquer Alice, who is engaged to César, seemingly a perfect man, but all he wants is her money.

Cast

Soundtrack

Volume 1

Volume 2

Ratings 

The first episode of Sol Nascente recorded a viewership rating of 25.4 points in Greater São Paulo an index recorded during the premiere of its predecessor, Êta Mundo Bom!.

References

External links 
  
 

2016 telenovelas
Brazilian telenovelas
2016 Brazilian television series debuts
TV Globo telenovelas
2017 Brazilian television series endings
Brazilian LGBT-related television shows
Gay-related television shows
Japanese-Brazilian culture
Portuguese-language telenovelas